Amiot may refer to:

People
 Félix Amiot (1894–1974), French aircraft designer and shipbuilding
 Jean Joseph Marie Amiot (1718–1793), French Jesuit missionary to China
 Jean-Claude Amiot (born 1939), French composer
 Mathieu Amiot ( 1629–1688), Sieur de Villeneuve, interpreter and seigneur in New France
 Maurice Amiot (1932–1961), French soldier
 Paul Amiot (1886–1979), French actor
 Pierre Amiot (1781–1839), farmer, businessman and political figure in Lower Canada
 Amiot Métayer (died 2003), gang leader in Haiti

Other
 Avions Amiot, the aviation company named for Félix Amiot, and the products of this company including:
 The Amiot 110
 The Amiot 120 series
 The Amiot 143
 The Amiot 354
 Amiot (car manufacturer), French car manufacturer

See also
 Amyot